Stickney is an unincorporated area in Wheatland Township, Barton County, Kansas, United States.  It is the site of a grain elevator, but there is no community or settlement at Stickney.

History
A post office opened at Stickney in 1898 and remained in operation until 1913.

Geography

Transportation
Stickney lies at the intersection of NW 190 Road, a paved east–west county road, and NW 30 Avenue, an unpaved north–south county road.

The Atchison, Topeka and Santa Fe Railway formerly operated a freight rail line that ran east–west through Stickney, but the line has since been removed.

References

Further reading

External links
 Barton County maps: Current, Historic, KDOT

Unincorporated communities in Barton County, Kansas
Unincorporated communities in Kansas